Colognole is a village in Tuscany, central Italy, administratively a frazione of the comune of San Giuliano Terme, province of Pisa. At the time of the 2001 census its population was 164.

Colognole is about 10 km from Pisa and 7 km from San Giuliano Terme.

References 

Frazioni of the Province of Pisa